Clement Geitner House is a historic home located at Hickory, Catawba County, North Carolina. It was built in 1882, and is a two-story, double pile brick dwelling on a stone foundation. It has a central hall plan and one-story full-width front porch. It has a large, -story brick veneer rear addition dated to the mid-20th century.

It was listed on the National Register of Historic Places in 1985.

References

Hickory, North Carolina
Houses on the National Register of Historic Places in North Carolina
Houses completed in 1882
Houses in Catawba County, North Carolina
National Register of Historic Places in Catawba County, North Carolina